Nepal competed at the 2017 Asian Indoor and Martial Arts Games in Ashgabat, Turkmenistan from 17 to 27 September 2017 with sending a delegation of 18 competitors for the event.
Nepal couldn't receive any medal at the multi-sport event.

Participants

References 

Nations at the 2017 Asian Indoor and Martial Arts Games
2017 in Nepalese sport